6-hydroxy-3-succinoylpyridine 3-monooxygenase (6-hydroxy-3-succinoylpyridine hydroxylase, hspA (gene), hspB (gene)) is an enzyme with systematic name 4-(6-hydroxypyridin-3-yl)-4-oxobutanoate,NADH:oxygen oxidoreductase (3-hydroxylating, succinate semialdehyde releasing). This enzyme catalyses the following chemical reaction

  4-(6-hydroxypyridin-3-yl)-4-oxobutanoate + 2 NADH + 2 H+ + O2  2,5-dihydroxypyridine + succinate semialdehyde + 2 NAD+ + H2O

6-hydroxy-3-succinoylpyridine 3-monooxygenase catalyses a reaction in the nicotine degradation pathway of Pseudomonas species.

References

External links 
 

EC 1.14.13